The Rizal Shrine in Calamba is a reproduction of the original two-story, Spanish-colonial style house in Calamba, Laguna where José Rizal was born on June 19, 1861. Rizal is regarded as one of the greatest national heroes of the Philippines. 

The house is designated as a National Shrine (Level 1) by the National Historical Commission of the Philippines. It is located along Mercado Street and Rizal Street in Calamba's Poblacion 5 and is in close proximity to St. John the Baptist Parish Church and the City College of Calamba.

History 
José Rizal's father, Francisco Rizal Mercado, took 2 years to build the original Rizal ancestral house. The Spanish authorities confiscated the house in 1891. Paciano Rizal, brother of José, reoccupied the house during the Philippine Revolution, but lost it again to the friars. It was subsequently sold, destroyed in World War II and eventually demolished.

In 1949, President Elpidio Quirino passed Executive Order No. 145, facilitating reconstruction of the house. Filipino school children provided most of the funding for the project while Juan F. Nakpil served as the supervising architect. Staying true to the original home, the reconstructed house occupies the same site and is built from the materials during the time the house was built.

On June 19, 1950, the newly built home was inaugurated and now serves as a repository for Rizal's memorabilia.

During the Centenary of the Philippine Independence in 1998, the National Commission for Culture and the Arts in cooperation with the National Centennial Commission, decided that Rizal's Shrine should focus specifically on his childhood.

The house is intended to provide an accurate representation of the home Rizal grew up in until his formal schooling in Biñan. Rizal's anecdotes often reference his childhood home, recounting the nipa hut in the garden where he learned to sleep and sculpt; the kitchen where he learned the alphabet; the bedroom where he learned to pray; the library where he discovered books and the azotea where he listened to his grandmother's stories of "skeletons, buried treasures and trees that bloomed with diamonds."

Near Rizal's home is the church where he was baptised, Saint John the Baptist Parish Church.

Features 

The Rizal Shrine is a typical rectangular Bahay na Bato, reminiscent of upper-class Filipino homes built during the Spanish Colonial era. The lower portion is made of adobe stone and brick, while the upper portion consists of hardwood. The original interior flooring of the house was discovered during reconstruction and utilized. It has sliding windows made of capiz shells, the exterior walls are painted green (originally white) and the roof is constructed of red ceramic tile. In June 2009, the National Historical Institute (now National Historical Commission of the Philippines) ordered the shrine's repainting to highlight the meaning of Rizal's surname.

The ground floor of the house historically served as a stable for horses and carriages. It contains several exhibits on Rizal's childhood, including exact copies of Rizal's writings, drawings and original baptismal certificate. The upper floor served as the family's living quarters and consisted of: the living room, dining area, bathroom and library. Containing more than 1000 books, a caida serves as Francisco Mercado's library, the largest private library in Calamba at that time. Adjacent to the library is the family's formal dining room, where Rizal's parents hosted guests and other prominent members of the society. The caida is connected to a sala, which leads to three bedrooms: the boys' room (for Jose and Paciano), the girls' room for his 9 sisters and the master bedroom. The biggest among all the rooms, the master bedroom contains the four-poster bed  where Rizal was born. Going beyond the sala is an informal dining room or comedor. Prominent in this room is the punkah, a large rectangular Indian fan. Next to the comedor and the azotea is an old well, one of the only surviving features of the original house.

Built in 1997, a gallery, library, audio-visual room and shop of Rizal memorabilia reside adjacent to the shrine. The shrine has a large lawn with a replica of the nipa hut and a statue depicting young Rizal with his dog. The statue was constructed in 1996 by Dudley Diaz for the centennial celebration commemorating Rizal's death. The remains of Rizal's parents, Francisco Rizal Mercado and Teodora Alonso Realonda, are also located in the shrine.

See also
 Rizal Park
 Rizal Shrine (Intramuros)
 Rizal Shrine (Dapitan)

References

Bibliography

External links

About the Rizal Shrine City Government of Calamba
Rizal Shrine National Historical Commission of the Philippines

Shrine, Calamba
Buildings and structures in Calamba, Laguna
Marked Historical Structures of the Philippines
Houses in the Philippines
Tourist attractions in Laguna (province)
Monuments and memorials in the Philippines
Biographical museums in the Philippines
Historic house museums in the Philippines
History museums in the Philippines
National Shrines of the Philippines
Juan Nakpil buildings